Lumaria is a genus of moths belonging to the subfamily Tortricinae of the family Tortricidae.

Species
Lumaria afrotropica Razowski, 2002
Lumaria imperita (Meyrick in Caradja & Meyrick, 1937)
Lumaria lotsunica Razowski, 2006
Lumaria petrophora (Meyrick, 1938)
Lumaria probolias (Meyrick, 1907)
Lumaria pusillana (Walker, 1863)
Lumaria rhythmologa (Meyrick in Caradja & Meyrick, 1937)
Lumaria zeteotoma Razowski, 1984
Lumaria zeugmatovalva Razowski, 1984
Lumaria zorotypa Razowski, 1984

See also
List of Tortricidae genera

References

 , 2002: The genera of Tortricidae (Lepidoptera) common for the Palaearctic and Afrotropical regions Acta zool. cracov. 45 (3): 197–205. Full article:

External links
tortricidae.com

Archipini
Tortricidae genera